The Georgia men's national tennis team represents Georgia in Davis Cup tennis competition and are governed by the Georgian Tennis Federation.

Georgia currently compete in the third group of Europe Zone. Their best result was in 2007 reaching the quarterfinals in the first group of Europe and Africa zone.

History
Georgia competed in its first Davis Cup in 1995.  Georgian players previously represented the USSR.

Current team (2022) 

 Aleksandre Metreveli
 Saba Purtseladze
 Aleksandre Bakshi
 Zura Tkemaladze

See also
Davis Cup
Georgia Fed Cup team

External links

Davis Cup teams
Davis Cup
Davis Cup